"Everything About You" is a song by Christian rock band Sanctus Real from their second album Fight the Tide. It was released as a radio single in mid-2004 and reached number 1 on R&R magazine's Christian rock radio format by August. It held the top position for at least six consecutive weeks.

Awards

On 2005, the song was nominated for a Dove Award for Rock Recorded Song of the Year at the 36th GMA Dove Awards.

References

2004 singles
Sanctus Real songs
2004 songs
Songs written by Matt Hammitt
Sparrow Records singles
Songs written by Tedd T